Arechi Castle is a castle in southern Italy located on top of a mountain (about 300m above sea level), at the foot of which lies the city of Salerno.

History 
The construction of the castle began in the 6th century under the Byzantine rule (the construction of the oldest part of the ramparts made of sandstone blocks is characteristic of this period).

Salerno was part of the Duchy of Benevento, which was the southernmost part of the Kingdom of the Lombards. When Charlemagne attacked the Lombards in the year 774, the Duchy of Benevento was ruled by Arechi II. He moved the main centre of power from Benevento to Salerno in order to strengthen his control over strategic areas such as the coastline and to secure communications within the province of Campania. During this period the castle was heavily fortified and its ramparts took the shape that have survived to our times.

Over the centuries, the castle had many owners. Archaeological work has identified, among other things, traces of the Norman presence. A watchtower was built north of the castle, allowing to conduct observations of the Gulf of Salerno.

Current condition 
Currently, the castle has been bought from the commune by a private company that arranged a restaurant inside. The defensive walls, however, are open to visitors free of charge, there is also a museum in the castle (large collections of coins and medieval ceramics were found during the renovation). At night, perfectly lit, it is visible from almost anywhere in Salerno.

References

 

Buildings and structures in Campania
Salerno
Castles in Italy
Lists of monuments and memorials in Italy